Godgifu is the name of:
Lady Godiva (c. 997 – 1067), Anglo-Saxon noblewoman 
Princess Goda of England (born 1004), daughter of King Ethelred the Unready